Euler's conjecture is a disproved conjecture in mathematics related to Fermat's Last Theorem.  It was proposed by Leonhard Euler in 1769. It states that for all integers  and  greater than 1, if the sum of  many th powers of positive integers is itself a th power, then  is greater than or equal to :

 ⇒ 

The conjecture represents an attempt to generalize Fermat's Last Theorem, which is the special case : if , then .

It is unknown whether the conjecture fails or holds for any value .

Background 
Euler was aware of the equality  involving sums of four fourth powers; this, however, is not a counterexample because no term is isolated on one side of the equation. He also provided a complete solution to the four cubes problem as in Plato's number  or the taxicab number 1729. The general solution of the equation

is

Counterexamples 
This was published in a paper comprising just two sentences. A total of three primitive (that is, in which the summands do not all have a common factor) counterexamples are known:
  (Lander & Parkin, 1966),
  (Scher & Seidl, 1996), and
  (Frye, 2004).

In 1988, Noam Elkies published a method to construct an infinite sequence of counterexamples for the  case. His smallest counterexample was
.

A particular case of Elkies' solutions can be reduced to the identity

where
.
From this initial rational point, one can compute an infinite collection of others. Substituting  into the identity and removing common factors gives the numerical example cited above.

In 1988, Roger Frye found the smallest possible counterexample 

This solution is the only one with values of the variables below 1,000,000.

Generalizations 

In 1967, L. J. Lander, T. R. Parkin, and John Selfridge conjectured that if 
,
In the special case , the conjecture states that if

(under the conditions given above) then .

The special case may be described as the problem of giving a partition of a perfect power into few like powers. Some of these are listed below. As of 2002, there are no solutions for  whose final term is ≤ 730000. 

See  for more data.

(Plato's number 216)

This is the case a = 1, b = 0 of Srinivasa Ramanujan's formula 

 

A cube as the sum of three cubes can also be parameterized as

or as

The number 2 100 0003 can be expressed as the sum of three cubes in nine different ways.

(R. Frye, 1988)

 (R. Norrie, 1911)
This is the smallest solution to the problem by R. Norrie.

(Lander & Parkin, 1966)

 (Lander, Parkin, Selfridge, smallest, 1967)

  (Lander, Parkin, Selfridge, second smallest, 1967)

  (Sastry, 1934, third smallest)

(M. Dodrill, 1999)

(S. Chase, 2000)

See also
 Jacobi–Madden equation
Prouhet–Tarry–Escott problem
Beal's conjecture
Pythagorean quadruple
Generalized taxicab number
Sums of powers, a list of related conjectures and theorems

References

External links 
 Tito Piezas III,  A Collection of Algebraic Identities
 Jaroslaw Wroblewski,  Equal Sums of Like Powers
 Ed Pegg Jr.,  Math Games, Power Sums
 James Waldby, A Table of Fifth Powers equal to a Fifth Power (2009) 
 R. Gerbicz, J.-C. Meyrignac, U. Beckert, All solutions of the Diophantine equation a6 + b6 = c6 + d6 + e6 + f6 + g6 for a,b,c,d,e,f,g < 250000 found with a distributed Boinc project
 EulerNet: Computing Minimal Equal Sums Of Like Powers
 
 
 
 Euler's Conjecture at library.thinkquest.org
 A simple explanation of Euler's Conjecture at Maths Is Good For You!

Diophantine equations
Disproved conjectures
Leonhard Euler